Mischief Night is a 2013 American horror film written and directed by Richard Schenkman. It focuses on a young girl with psychosomatic blindness being terrorized by a hooded killer.

Plot

Emily Walton is a young woman with psychosomatic blindness caused by a car accident that killed her mother. Emily is trying to adjust to her blindness and at the same time is being smothered by her father. On Mischief Night, when her father goes out on a date leaving her alone, she is terrorized by a hooded figure. Emily must fight for her life in order to survive and protect herself and everyone she holds dear from the intruder.

Cast
 Noell Coet as Emily Walton
 Ian Bamberg as Jimmy
 Adam C. Edwards as The Intruder
 Stephanie Erb as Lauren
 Daniel Hugh Kelly as David Walton
 Erica Leerhsen as Kim
 Shannon Makhanian as Emily's Mother
 Charlie O'Connell as Will
 Richard Riehle as Trucker
 Ally Walker as Dr. Pomock

Production

Mischief Night was written and directed by Richard Schenkman, from a story idea by Eric Wilkinson and Jesse Baget. 
Development for the film began in 2007 after the release of The Man From Earth, which Schenkman produced. Baget and Wilkinson had both grown up in New Jersey where Mischief Night was "celebrated" by the two filmmakers, according to Schenkmen " with real vigour". Lifelong fans of the horror genre, Baget and Wilkinson developed a scenario for a horror film centered around the holiday, which they subsequently pitched to Image Entertainment. After successfully pitching the film to Image, Baget then worked on the film's screenplay, with the intention of directing the film himself. Baget, however, was forced to drop out due to scheduling conflicts with other projects. Instead, the filmmakers approached Schenkman with an offer to direct the film, as the group had become close friends after their work together on The Man From Earth. Baget's initial screenplay contained many of the film's action and key plot points, including Emily's blindness, which was carried into the film's final draft.

Casting and filming
For the role of the film's main protagonist Emily Walton, extensive auditions were done to find the right actress for the role, "it had to be somebody young, somebody whom the audience would believe was only 17. She also had to be able to be convincingly blind, somebody who could find the humor in the role, somebody funny & charming because it certainly wasn’t all screaming and crying" as Schankman later stated in an interview. The role later went to Noell Coet, who had previously starred in minor roles before being cast in the film. Coet did extensive research on blindness in preparation for the role. Stephanie Erb and Richard Riehle, both of whom Schenkmen had previously worked with, were later cast for the roles of Aunt Lauren, and Trucker respectively.

Release
Mischief Night was released on DVD by Image Entertainment on December 17, 2013. The film also had a limited theatrical release at the same time.

Critical response

Jamie S. Rich from The Oregonian gave the film a positive review stating, "It works fairly well, and Mischief Night should make for a pretty good pregame show the night before Halloween".
Felix Vasquez Jr. from Cinema Crazed.com stated in his review on the film, "Surely it won't win awards for originality, but it takes a pretty old idea and transforms it in to a very entertaining stalk and slash horror film worth watching".
Alan Spencer from Cinesploitation.com gave the film a positive review stating, "Mischief Night is based more on execution and suspense rather than bloodletting. If you've seen them all, I say give this one a try. It stands out against the current standard slasher tripe".

Eric Havens  from Downright Creepy.com called the film "shallow and superficial". Havens concluded his review by writing, "What could have been a fleshed out story of a girl dealing with grief and guilt becomes nothing but a scream session filled with vague intentions and no real resolution. While this fits in fine with the theory of horror film as symbolic sacrifice, it does little to make Mischief Night a good film." Brad McHargue from Dread Central gave the film a score of 2.5 out of 5, calling it "a The Strangers rehash, replete with similar motives and set-ups". McHargue also criticized the film's uninspired direction, slow pacing, and performances, which he called "a mixed bag". Patrick Cooper from Bloody Disgusting offered similar criticism, stating that the film was "too bogged down by its disjointed pacing and narrative to really hit the mark."

See also 
List of films featuring home invasions

References

External links
 
 
 
 

2013 films
2013 horror films
2013 horror thriller films
2010s slasher films
American horror thriller films
American slasher films
Direct-to-video horror films
Films about blind people
Films about dysfunctional families
Halloween horror films
Films directed by Richard Schenkman
2010s English-language films
2010s American films